This is a list of venues used for professional baseball in Tacoma, Washington. The information is a synthesis of the information contained in the references listed.

Tacoma Baseball Park aka South Eleventh Street Grounds
Home of:
Tacoma Tigers – Pacific Northwest League (1890–1892)
Tacoma Tigers – New Pacific League (1896) (folded mid-season)
Tacoma Tigers – Pacific Northwest League (1901–1902)
Tacoma Tigers – Pacific National League (1903)
Tacoma Tigers – Pacific Coast League (1904 – mid-1905) (moved to Sacramento)
Tacoma Tigers – Northwestern League (1906)
Location: South 11th Street (north, home plate); L Street (east, left field); 12th Street (now Earnest S Brazill Street) (south, center field); M Street (west, right field)
Currently: commercial businesses

Tacoma Athletic Park or just Athletic Park
Home of:
Tacoma Tigers – Northwestern League (1907 – mid-1917) (league failed)
Tacoma Cubs – Washington State League (1910)
Tacoma Tigers – PCL (1918)
Tacoma Tigers – Pacific Coast International League aka International Northwest League (1919) (league failed mid-season), (1920–1921)
Tacoma – WIL (1922) (league failed mid-season)
Tacoma Tigers – Western International League (1937–1942)
Location: 14th Street (north, first base); South Sprague Street (east, third base); 15th Street (south, left field); South State Street (west, right field); South Ferry teed into 14th near first base
Currently: Peck Athletic Fields

Tiger Park / Cheney Field
Home of: Tacoma Tigers – Western International League (1946–1951)
Location: 3801 South Lawrence Street (west); South 38th Street (north); South 40th Street (south)
Currently: commercial businesses

Cheney Stadium
Home of:
Tacoma Giants – PCL (1960–1965)
Tacoma Cubs/Twins/Yankees/Tugs/Tigers/Rainiers – PCL (1966–present)
Location 2502 South Tyler Street (east, right field); Scott-Pierson Trail and State Highway 16 (southwest, home plate and third base); Clay Huntington Way (north, left and center fields)

References
Peter Filichia, Professional Baseball Franchises, Facts on File, 1993.
Tacoma City Directories – various years – via Ancestry.com

See also
Lists of baseball parks

External links
 Sanborn map of Tacoma showing the 11th Street ballpark, as it was in 1896
 Sanborn map of Tacoma showing Athletic Park, as it was in 1950

Tacoma
Baseball venues in Washington (state)
Sports venues in Tacoma, Washington
baseball parks